Espen Lind (born 13 May 1971) is a Norwegian record producer, songwriter, singer, and multi-instrumentalist. He is one half of the production team Espionage, and together with his long time partner Amund Bjorklund he has written and/or produced songs for artists like Taylor Swift, Beyoncé, Train, Jennifer Hudson, Emeli Sande and Selena Gomez. Espen has also been a mentor on the Norwegian version of The Voice.

Solo records 
Espen Lind released his first solo album, Mmm...Prepare To Be Swayed, in 1995 under the moniker, 'Sway'. Only released in Norway, it received mixed reviews and sold approximately 5,000 copies. His commercial breakthrough came in 1997 with the single "When Susannah Cries" which was a hit in several European and Latin American countries, including Norway where it was number one for six weeks. His second album Red went on to sell more than 100,000 copies in Norway, and 350,000 copies worldwide, earning Lind three Norwegian Grammy awards (Spellemannprisen) in 1998, including Artist of the Year.

2000 saw Lind releasing his third album, This Is Pop Music, and the singles "Black Sunday" and "Life Is Good". The album also contains a duet, "Where the Lost Ones Go," with Norwegian singer Sissel Kyrkjebø. The album reached gold status in Norway but was generally perceived to be a commercial disappointment compared to its predecessor. After a 3-year break Lind released a new single, "Unloved," in December 2004, followed by the album April, in January 2005.

In 2006 Lind, together with fellow Norwegian artists Kurt Nilsen (World Idol winner), Alejandro Fuentes and Askil Holm released the concert album Hallelujah Live, featuring songs from the foursome's solo records as well as several songs by other artists, most notably a cover version of Leonard Cohen's "Hallelujah".

Lind released a new single, "Scared Of Heights," in May 2008. His fifth album titled Army Of One was released on 23 June 2008.

In January 2009 he received the award "Årets Spelleman" (artist of the year) at the Norwegian Grammy Awards.

Writing and producing 

During the past few years Espen Lind has done a lot of writing and producing, most notably as co-writer of "Irreplaceable" by Beyoncé and "Drive By" and "Hey, Soul Sister" by Train. Together with writing partner Amund Bjørklund in the production team Espionage he has also written and/or produced songs for artists Lionel Richie, Ne-Yo, Chris Brown and Leona Lewis.  Morten Harket covered Lind's "Scared of Heights" for his album Out of My Hands.

Selected credits 
"Enough" – Emeli Sandé
"Sing Together" – Train
"Mermaid" – Train, No. 12 Billboard Adult Pop Songs
"Bruises" – Train, No. 79 Billboard Hot 100
"50 Ways to Say Goodbye" – Train, No. 20 Billboard Hot 100
"Drive By" – Train, No. 10 Billboard Hot 100
"Brick By Brick" – Train
"Hey, Soul Sister" – Train, No. 3 Billboard Hot 100
"Half Moon Bay" – Train
"Can't Stop the Rain" – Jennifer Hudson
"Pastime" – Lionel Richie
"My Little Secret" – Cavo
"Ghost" – Cavo
"I Need a Girl" – Trey Songz – No. 6 Billboard Hot R&B/Hip-Hop Songs
"Irreplaceable" – Beyoncé – No. 1 Billboard Hot 100
"With You"  – Chris Brown – No. 2 Billboard Hot 100
 "Angel" – Leona Lewis
"Now You Tell Me" – Jordin Sparks
"Just for the Record" – Jordin Sparks
"Go On Girl" – Ne-Yo
"One Word" – Elliott Yamin
"I Don't Wanna Care" – Jessica Simpson
"The One That Got Away" – Johnta Austin
"Underdog" – Jonas Brothers
"The Very First Night" - Taylor Swift
"I Will Be With You" – Sarah Brightman/Paul Stanley
"The Last Goodbye" – Atomic Kitten
"Cry" – Kym Marsh
"Come Back To Me" – David Cook – No. 6 Billboard Hot Adult Top 40 Tracks
"Life on the Moon" – David Cook
"Lie" – David Cook
"It's Gotta Be Love" – Lee DeWyze
"Stay Here" – Lee DeWyze

Discography
The following is a discography of albums and singles released by Norwegian music artist Espen Lind.

Albums

Singles

References

External links

 Biography Espen Lind – at Universal
 Espen Lind –  official website

1971 births
APRA Award winners
English-language singers from Norway
Living people
Norwegian multi-instrumentalists
Norwegian pop singers
Norwegian songwriters
Musicians from Tromsø
Spellemannprisen winners
21st-century Norwegian singers
21st-century Norwegian male singers